Mordellistena kaszabi is a beetle in the genus Mordellistena of the family Mordellidae. It was described in 1965 by Ermisch.

References

kaszabi
Beetles described in 1965